Garbh is an Irish word describing a rugged landscape feature.

It can be found in :
 Garbh Sgeir, skerry in the Small Isles in Scotland ;
 Garbh Eileach, skerry in the Garvellachs in Scotland.